Frank Marshall (26 January 1929 – August 2015) was an English professional football player and manager.

Life and career
Marshall was born in Sheffield in 1929. After playing youth football for Sheffield United and non-League football for Scarborough, he played in the Football League for Rotherham United, Scunthorpe United and Doncaster Rovers.

While still a player, Marshall became caretaker manager of Doncaster Rovers between March and April 1962. After retiring as a player, Marshall remained on the staff of Doncaster to act as a coach. Marshall later became assistant manager at Mansfield Town, before moving to Sweden, where he managed IS Halmia from 1974 to 1979 and Landskrona BoIS between 1980 and 1981.

Marshall died in Sweden in August 2015 at the age of 86.

References

1929 births
2015 deaths
English footballers
Association football wing halves
Sheffield United F.C. players
Scarborough F.C. players
Rotherham United F.C. players
Scunthorpe United F.C. players
Doncaster Rovers F.C. players
English Football League players
English football managers
Doncaster Rovers F.C. managers
Landskrona BoIS managers
IS Halmia managers
English expatriate football managers
Expatriate football managers in Sweden